Salmon River Reservoir, also known as the Redfield Reservoir, is a man-made lake located near the hamlet of Redfield, New York. The reservoir was created with the completion of a hydroelectric dam in 1912. It has the capacity to hold  of water. It is the larger of the Salmon River's two reservoirs.

Fishing
Fish species present in the lake include brown trout, rainbow trout, smallmouth bass, walleye, yellow perch, and pumpkinseed sunfish.

References

Lakes of New York (state)
Lakes of Oswego County, New York